Robert G. Bednarik (born 6 April 1944 in Vienna) is an Australian prehistorian and cognitive archeologist.

Robert Bednarik moved from Austria to Australia in 1966. Bednarik, who considers himself an autodidact, is an expert in the fields of rock art and paleolithic portable art. He conducts experimental archeology and edits four scientific journals.

According to Bednarik, he has published more than 1450 scientific articles since 1965. He is professor at the International Centre of Rock Art Dating (ICRAD) at the Hebei Normal University in Shijiazhuang (China).

Bednarik's principal research interest is the origins of the human ability to create constructs of reality; consequently, his research focuses on the origins of art, language, and the development of hominid technology.

Publications  (selection) 
 Books 
 Rock art science: the scientific study of palaeoart. IFRAO-Brepols Series 1, Brepols, Turnhout 2001, .
 The human condition. Springer, New York 2011, .
 Creating the human past. Archaeopress, Oxford 2013, .
 (Hrsg.): The origins of modern human behaviour. Nova Press, New York, NY. 2013, ; darin S. 1–58: The psychology of human behaviour
 The first mariners. Research India Press, New Delhi 2014, .
 Myths about rock art. Archaeopress Archeology, Oxford 2016, .
 Palaeoart of the Ice Age. Cambridge Scholars Publishing, Newcastle upon Tyne 2017, .
 Tribology in geology and archaeology. Nova Science Publishers, New York 2019 .
 The domestication of humans. Routledge, London and New York 2020, .

 Articles
 On the cognitive development of hominids. In: Man and Environment 15(2), 1990, S. 1–7.
 Palaeoart and archaeological myths. In: Cambridge Archaeological Journal 2(1), 1992, 27–43.
 Concept-mediated marking in the Lower Palaeolithic. In: Current Anthropology 36(4), 1995, 605–634.
 The ‘australopithecine’ cobble from Makapansgat, South Africa. South African Archaeological Bulletin 53: 1998, 4–8.
 The dating of rock art: a critique. In: Journal of Archaeological Science 29(11), 2002, 1213–1233.
 The oldest surviving rock art: a taphonomic review. In: Origini 24, 2002, 335–349.
 The earliest evidence of palaeoart. In: Rock Art Research 20 (2), 2003, 89–135.
 Children as Pleistocene artists. In: Rock Art Research 25 (2), 2008, 173–182.
 The domestication of humans. In: Anthropologie 46(1), 2008, 1–17.
 The mythical Moderns. In: Journal of World Prehistory 21(2), 2008, 85–102.
 An aetiology of hominin behaviour. In: HOMO — Journal of Comparative Human Biology 63, 2012, 319–335; doi:10.1016/j.jchb.2012.07.004
 The tribology of cupules. In: Geological Magazine 152(4), 2015, S. 758–765; doi:10.1017/S0016756815000060
 The science of cupules. In: Archaeometry 58(6), 2016, S. 899-911; doi: 10.1111/arcm.12216
 Compressive-tensile rock markings. In: Geological Magazine 156(12), 2019, S. 2113-2116; doi:10.1017/S0016756819001079
 Archaeotribology: the interaction of surfaces in relative motion in archaeology. In: Tribology International 141; doi:10.1016/j.triboint.2020.106198
 About the origins of the human ability to create constructs of reality. In: Axiomathes; doi:10.1007/s10516-021-09537-8

References

External links 
 Homepage of Robert G. Bednarik
 complete list of publications at  www.ifrao.com
 Robert G. Bednarik at academia.edu
 Robert G. Bednarik at researchgate.net

Australian archaeologists
Australian anthropologists
1944 births
Living people
Prehistorians